Joshua Logan Baldwin (born April 9, 1996) is an American professional baseball outfielder in the San Francisco Giants organization.

Career
Baldwin attended Ringgold High School in Ringgold, Georgia. After high school, he enrolled at Georgia Southern to play college baseball for the Georgia Southern Eagles. The San Francisco Giants selected Baldwin in the 21st round of the 2017 MLB draft, and he signed for $60,000.

2017 season 
After being drafted, Baldwin was assigned to the Salem-Keizer Volcanoes in early July, averaging .342 over 50 games.

2018 season 
In 2018, Baldwin was assigned to the Augusta GreenJackets in late March.

References

External links
Career statistics and player information from MLB, The Baseball Cube, Baseball-Reference (Minors), and MiLB.

1996 births
Living people
People from Ringgold, Georgia
Baseball players from Georgia (U.S. state)
Baseball outfielders
Georgia Southern Eagles baseball players
Salem-Keizer Volcanoes players
Minor league baseball players
San Jose Giants players
Augusta GreenJackets players